The First All-Union Congress of Soviets was a congress of representatives of Soviets of workers, peasants and Red Army deputies, held on December 30, 1922 in Moscow. The congress was attended by 2215 delegates (1727 from the Russian Socialist Federative Soviet Republic, 364 from the Ukrainian Socialist Soviet Republic, 91 from the Transcaucasian Socialist Federative Soviet Republic, 33 from the Belarusian Socialist Soviet Republic). Kalinin was elected chairman of the congress, but Vladimir Lenin, who was not present at the congress due to illness, was elected honorary chairman of the congress. More than 90% of the delegates were members of the Russian Communist Party, 2 left-wing social federalists of the Caucasus, 1 anarchist and 1 member of the Jewish Social Democratic Party.

The congress approved the Declaration and the Treaty on the Formation of a New State – the Union of Soviet Socialist Republics. 4 states have united in the Soviet Union: Russian Socialist Federative Soviet Republic, Ukrainian Socialist Soviet Republic, Belarusian Socialist Soviet Republic, Transcaucasian Socialist Federative Soviet Republic. In addition, the congress elected the Central Executive Committee of the Soviet Union.

Order of the day
Consideration of the Declaration on the Formation of the Soviet Union. Speaker – Joseph Stalin.
Consideration of the Treaty on the Formation of the Soviet Union. Speaker – Joseph Stalin.
Election of the Central Executive Committee of the Soviet Union. Speaker – Avel Yenukidze.

Congress decisions

Elected at the congress
First All-Union Central Executive Committee (unicameral, totaling 371 members)

Accepted documents
Greetings to Comrade Vladimir Lenin, Honorary Chairman of the First Congress of Soviets of the Soviet Union
Declaration on the Formation of the Soviet Union
Treaty on the Formation of the Soviet Union
Decisions:
 On Approval of the Declaration and Treaty on the Formation of the Soviet Union
 About the Foundation of the House of the Soviet Union
 On the Establishment of the Central People's Institute of Agriculture
 On the Celebration of the Foundation Day of the Union of Soviet Socialist Republics

Main outcome of the congress
The Congress made official the formal foundation of the Union of Soviet Socialist Republics. It was this congress that formalized its foundation by the passage of the Union Treaty, which would serve as a provisional constitution until the passage of a proper constitution for the new federal republic by the Congress.

Sources
History of the Communist Party of the Soviet Union. Volume 4, Book 1 – Moscow, 1970 – Pages 196–210
Vladimir Lenin. To the Question of Nationalities or "Autonomy" / Vladimir Lenin // Complete Works: in 55 Volumes. Volume 45 / Vladimir Lenin; Institute of Marxism–Leninism at the Central Committee of the Communist Party of the Soviet Union – 5th Edition – Moscow: Publishing House of Political Literature of the Central Committee of the Communist Party of the Soviet Union, 1970 – Pages 356–362 – 26, 729 Pages
First Congress of Soviets of the Union of Soviet Socialist Republics: Verbatim Report: December 30, 1922 / Union of Soviet Socialist Republics – Moscow: Publishing House of the Central Executive Committee of the Soviet Union, 1923 – 24 Pages
Congresses of Soviets of the Soviet Union, Union and Autonomous Soviet Socialist Republics: Collection of Documents. Volume 3 / Academy of Sciences of the Soviet Union, Institute of Law – Moscow, 1960 – 398 Pages
Sophia Yakubovskaya. The Development of the Soviet Union as a Union State: 1922–1936 / Sophia Yakubovskaya; Academy of Sciences of the Soviet Union, Institute of History of the Soviet Union – Moscow: Science, 1972 – 230 Pages

External links
First Congress of Soviets of the Soviet Union // Great Soviet Encyclopedia: in 30 Volumes / Editor-in-chief Alexander Prokhorov – 3rd Edition – Moscow: Soviet Encyclopedia, 1969–1978

Congress of Soviets of the Soviet Union
December 1922 events
Russian Revolution